Maîche is a commune in the Doubs department in the Bourgogne-Franche-Comté region in eastern France.

Geography
Maîche is situated between the rivers Doubs and Dessoubre. It is surrounded by evergreen forests. The highest point in the commune is the Faux Verger.

Population

See also
 Communes of the Doubs department

References

External links

 Official website 
 Maîche on the intercommunal Web site of the department 

Communes of Doubs